Stadion Warty Poznań, also known as Stadion przy Drodze Dębińskiej and nicknamed Ogródek, is a football stadium located in the Wilda district of Poznań, Poland.

Originally the stadium was a training ground for Edmund Szyc Stadium however since it fell into disrepair in 1998 and was sold in 2001 it became the team's main ground, having been expanded (from 2500 capacity) and modernised over the years to suit the team's needs.

References

Poznań
Football venues in Poznań
Buildings and structures in Poznań
Sports venues in Greater Poland Voivodeship